City Nights: Live at the Jazz Standard is the first of three live albums by saxophonist Frank Morgan that were recorded at the Jazz Standard in 2003 and released on the HighNote label.

Reception

The review by AllMusic's Al Campbell said: "saxophonist Frank Morgan continues to illuminate the Charlie Parker style of bebop he's been playing since the mid-'50s ... Morgan is featured on alto saxophone throughout, accompanied by an excellent trio of jazz stalwarts who have frequently collaborated over the years ... These musicians work collective wonders and consistently inspire Morgan, making this set highly recommended". 

All About Jazz writer Florence Wetzel stated "Despite his stature in the jazz world, Morgan still considers himself a student of the music; as he says in the liner notes, "I'm on a Monk journey." This fresh approach combined with years of experience gives City Nights a wonderful vitality. It's 64 minutes of pure delight, jazz at its classic best played by a living master".

In JazzTimes, David Franklin noted "The set was completely unrehearsed and even unplanned. Except for a spot in “Cherokee” where disagreement about the tune’s form surfaces briefly, the informality of the session, with its resulting in-the-moment freshness, was a good thing".

In The Guardian, John Fordham wrote "This may appeal chiefly to those who know Morgan and wondered what he was up to, but on this evidence that's quite a lot".

Track listing 
 "Georgia on My Mind" (Hoagy Carmichael, Stuart Gorrell) – 5:16
 "Cherokee" (Ray Noble) – 10:26
 "Summertime" (George Gershwin, Ira Gershwin, DuBose Heyward) – 7:44
 "All Blues" (Miles Davis) – 7:27	
 "I Mean You" (Coleman Hawkins, Thelonious Monk) – 7:41
 "'Round Midnight" (Thelonious Monk, Cootie Williams, Bernie Hanighen) – 6:20
 "Equinox" (John Coltrane) – 12:09
 "Impressions" (Coltrane) – 8:17

Personnel

Performance
Frank Morgan – alto saxophone
George Cables – piano
Curtis Lundy – bass
Billy Hart – drums

Production
Reggie Marshall – producer
Randall Funke – engineer

References 

Frank Morgan (musician) live albums
2004 live albums
HighNote Records live albums
Albums recorded at Jazz Standard